Noble Beast  is American singer-songwriter Andrew Bird's fifth solo studio album, released on January 20, 2009. Two songs from this album were previewed on his webpage, "Oh No" and "Carrion Suite", while the entire album was made available by NPR as a streaming feed. Noble Beast was made available as a standard CD release, a special limited-edition deluxe two-CD package and a double-LP package.

The track "Tenuousness" appears in the closing credits for the 2011 movie Crazy, Stupid, Love.

Reception
{{Album ratings
| title = 
| subtitle =
| state = 

| MC = 79/100

| rev1 = AllMusic
| rev1Score = 
| rev2 = The A.V. Club
| rev2Score = (B+)
| rev3 = Drowned in Sound
| rev3Score = (9/10)
| rev4 = The Guardian
| rev4Score = 
| rev5 = LA Times
| rev5Score = 
| rev6 = Paste| rev6Score = (6.7/10)
| rev7 = Tiny Mix Tapes
| rev7Score =
| rev8 = Pitchfork Media
| rev8Score =  (7.5/10)
| rev9 = Rolling Stone| rev9Score = 
| rev10 = The Skinny| rev10Score = 
| rev11 = Spin| rev11Score = (7/10)
| rev12 = Uncut 
| rev12Score = 
}}
The album received a Metacritic score of 79 out of 100 based on 29 reviews, indicating generally favorable reviews.

The album debuted on the Billboard 200 chart at No. 12, and No. 3 on the Top Rock Albums Albums chart, selling 26,000 copies in the first week.  The album has sold 150,000 copies in the United States .

Track listing

Other appearances
 "Not a Robot, But a Ghost" samples from the song "First Impossible," which appears on Dosh's album Wolves and Wishes.
 "The Privateers" uses the same lyrics as "The Confession," a song appearing on Oh! The Grandeur by Andrew Bird's Bowl of Fire.
 A different version of "Section 8 City" appears on Fingerlings 4.

Useless Creatures (Deluxe edition bonus disc)

The limited edition of Noble Beast shipped with a companion disc of instrumental songs, entitled Useless Creatures. This collection was made available on Bird's website in early January, before the album's release. Noble Beast / Useless Creatures'' was deleted after a single run, both in the US and the UK, exclusively.

Personnel
Andrew Bird - violin, vocals, whistling, guitar
Martin Dosh - percussion, looping, keys
Jeremy Ylvislaker - guitar, bass, organ, shortwave
Kelly Hogan - background vocals
Mike Lewis - clarinet
Todd Sickafoose - double bass
Ben Martin - cardboard box drums
Tony Crow - juno

Charts

References

Andrew Bird albums
2009 albums